Helmut Stuhlpfarrer (born 19 March 1959) is a former Austrian mountain runner who was three times silver medal at individual senior level at the World Mountain Running Championships (1985, 1986, 1987).

References

External links
 Helmut Stuhlpfarrer profile at Association of Road Racing Statisticians

1959 births
Living people
Place of birth missing (living people)
Austrian male mountain runners